The name Nesat has been used to name four tropical cyclones in the western north Pacific Ocean. The name was submitted by Cambodia and means fishing.

 Typhoon Nesat (2005) (T0504, 04W, Dante) – a powerful typhoon which approached Japan but eventually stayed at sea.
 Typhoon Nesat (2011) (T1117, 20W, Pedring) – a strong typhoon which severely impacted the Philippines and South China, killing 98 people and causing $2.12 billion worth of damage.
 Typhoon Nesat (2017) (T1709, 11W, Gorio) — a typhoon which claimed 3 lives and caused $282.3 million worth of damage after impacting Taiwan and East China.
 Typhoon Nesat (2022) (T2220, 23W, Neneng) — a typhoon that affected the Philippines, Taiwan and Vietnam, but caused no fatalities along its path.

Pacific typhoon set index articles